Fast chess, also known as Speed chess, is a type of chess in which each player is given less time to consider their moves than normal tournament time controls allow. Fast chess is subdivided, by decreasing time controls, into rapid chess, blitz chess, and bullet chess. Armageddon chess is a particular variation of fast chess in which different rules apply for each of the two players.

As of February 2023, the top-ranked rapid chess player in the open section is Magnus Carlsen from Norway, who is also the top-ranked classical chess player and reigning world champion. The top-ranked blitz chess player as of February 2023 is Alireza Firouzja.

As of February 2023, the women's top-ranked blitz player is Tan Zhongyi from China. China's Hou Yifan is the top-ranked rapid player, who is also the top-ranked women's classical chess player.

FIDE rules 
The World Chess Federation (FIDE) divides time controls for chess into "classical" time controls, and the fast chess time controls. , for master-level players (with an Elo of 2200 or higher) the regulations state that at least 120 minutes per player (based on a 60-move game) must be allocated for a game to be rated on the "classical" list; for lower-rated players, this can be reduced to as little as 60 minutes. Games played faster than these time controls can be rated for rapid and blitz if they comply with the time controls for those categories.

Players of fast and blitz chess are exempt from the requirement to record their moves onto a scoresheet (A.2). The arbiter or their assistant is responsible for the recording in competitions (A.3.1.2, B.3.1.2). Electronic recording is preferred.

Overview 
A fast chess game can be further divided into several categories, which are primarily distinguished by the selection of time controls. Games may be played with or without time increments per move.

Rapid (FIDE), quick (USCF), or active
Time controls for each player in a game of rapid chess are, according to FIDE, more than 10 minutes but less than 60 minutes. Rapid chess can be played with or without time increments for each move. When time increments are used, a player can automatically gain, for instance, ten more seconds on the clock after each move. When time increments are used, the total time per player for a 60-move game must be more than 10 minutes but less than 60 minutes. Rapid chess was called active chess by FIDE between 1987 and 1989.

For the FIDE World Rapid Championship, each player has 15 minutes plus 10 seconds additional time per move starting from move 1.

Blitz 
Time controls for each player in a game of blitz chess are, according to FIDE, 10 minutes or less per player. This can be played with or without an increment or delay per move, made possible by the adoption of digital clocks. Three minutes with a two-second increment is preferred. In the case of time increments, the total time per player for a 60-move game must be 10 minutes or less (hence averaging 10 seconds or less per move).

For the FIDE World Blitz Championship, each player has 3 minutes plus 2 additional seconds per move, starting from move 1.

Bullet 
A variant of blitz chess, bullet chess games have less than three minutes per player, based on a 40-move game; some chess servers rate one-minute-per-player games separately. Lower time controls are called "hyperbullet" and "ultrabullet" for 30-second-per-player and 15-second-per-player games, respectively. Other common time-control options for bullet games include two minutes with one-second increment, one minute with a two-second increment, or one minute with one-second increment. The term lightning can also be applied to this variant. The use of increment in bullet chess is primarily to avoid issues with latency as well as so-called "dirty flagging".

Online bullet chess avoids practical problems associated with live bullet chess, particularly players accidentally knocking over the pieces. Playing online also allows premoving, or committing to a move before the opponent has taken their turn.

Armageddon 
A variant of blitz chess where a drawn game is counted as a win for Black. This guarantees the game ends decisively, so it can be used as a final tiebreaker game. It is used in tournaments such as Chess World Cup as a tiebreaker.

To compensate for giving Black draw odds, White has more time on the clock. Common times are six minutes for White and five minutes for Black or five minutes for White and four minutes for Black. This can also be played with a small increment.

Some tournaments utilise a bidding system for individual players of each match to decide how little time they would be willing to play with as black. The player with the lowest bid for each match receives the black pieces with draw odds. This system minimises the perceived unfairness of Armageddon time controls that are decided in advance before a tournament with colours randomly allocated. Such an idea is reminiscent of the logical use case of fair cake-cutting.

Other terms 

Lightning An alternative term for blitz chess, or for an extremely fast form of chess. It can also refer to games with a fixed amount of time (e.g. ten seconds) for each move, or to one-minute games.

History and rules 
Before the advent of digital clocks, five minutes per side was the standard for blitz or speed chess. Before the introduction of chess clocks, chess club "rapid transit" tournaments had referees who called out every ten seconds. The Washington Divan (2445 15th St. NW) had regular weekly games and used a special clock that beeped every ten seconds to indicate the time to move. Players had to use their full ten seconds and move on the bell.

In 1988, Walter Browne formed the World Blitz Chess Association and its magazine Blitz Chess, which folded in 2003.

In some chess tournaments and matches, the final standings of the contestants are decided by a series of games with ever-shortening control times as tie breaks. In this case, two games may be played with each time control, as playing with black or white pieces is not equally liked among players. The short time controls in fast chess reduce the amount of time available to consider each move, and may result in a frantic game, especially as time runs out. A player whose time runs out automatically loses, unless the opposing player has insufficient material to checkmate, in which case the game is a draw. "Losing on time" is possible at even the longer, traditional time controls, but is more common in blitz and rapid versions.

Play is governed by the FIDE Laws of Chess, except as modified by a specific tournament. However, in case of a dispute during a tournament, either player may stop the clock and call the arbiter to make a final and binding judgment.

Chess boxing uses a fast version for the chess component of the sport, granting 9 minutes for each side with no increment.

USCF rules for Quick and Blitz chess 
The rules for fast chess differ between FIDE and the USCF.

With the USCF, a game with more than 10 minutes affects the Quick rating, and the upper bounds for this rating is capped at 65 minutes per player. As 30-minute to 65-minute-per-player time controls are also under the Regular rating system, these games affect both the Quick and Regular ratings and are known as dual-rated games. However, the K factor (a statistic used for ratings) is reduced by comparison, meaning that players will either lose or gain (or rarely both) fewer rating points compared to a solely Quick or Regular game. Any time control over 65 minutes counts under the Regular rating only. All of these time controls include the delay added to the time control, such as a 60-minute game with a 5-second delay, which is still considered to be a 60-minute game, not a 65-minute game.

As of March 2013, the USCF has also added a separate Blitz class rating for any time control between 5 and 10 minutes per player. It is not possible for a game to be dual rated as both Blitz and Quick. Unlike Quick chess, 5 minutes can also mean game 3+2 (three minutes with a two-second increment).

World championships 

Both official and unofficial FIDE-sponsored world championships for fast chess have been held since the 1970s.

World Rapid championships before 2012 
In 1987, Garry Kasparov (the World Champion of classical chess at the time) and Nigel Short played a 6-game exhibition Rapid match ("Speed Chess Challenge") at the London Hippodrome, won by Kasparov 4–2.

The 1988 victory by Anatoly Karpov in Mazatlan was officially called the World Active Championship, but FIDE changed the word 'active' to 'rapid' soon after.

In 1992, FIDE held the Women's World Rapid and Blitz Championship in Budapest, Hungary. Both Rapid and Blitz Championships were won by Susan Polgar.

The 2001 victory by Garry Kasparov in the FIDE World Cup of Rapid Chess (organized by the French Chess Federation in Cannes) was held contemporaneously to the Melody Amber rapids (thus splitting the top players between the two events), and it is sometimes considered to be official, although it was never named as a "championship" but rather a "world cup".

Viswanathan Anand won the official FIDE 2003 Rapid Championship at the 6th Cap d'Agde event. After no bids in 2004, FIDE optioned the 2005 Rapid to Cap d'Agde, but it was not held. Teimour Radjabov won the 2006 7th Cap d’Agde Rapid Chess Tournament, but this had no FIDE status.

The yearly Frankfurt or Mainz events hosted by the Chess Tigers (2001–2010) were considered as the traditional rapid chess championship, and it often received world championship billing in the absence of an annual FIDE-recognized championship. In its last two years, the 2009 Grenkeleasing World Rapid Chess Championship in Mainz was won by Levon Aronian, and the 2010 Open GRENKE Rapid World Championship in Mainz was won by Gata Kamsky. The Association of Chess Professionals (ACP) also held a World Rapid Cup in some of these years, and the annual Amber chess tournament (1992 to 2011) also had a rapid segment. There was also occasionally a Eurotel Trophy or Intel Grand Prix event, each of which would be of high stature.

World Blitz championships before 2012 
The first unofficial Speed Chess Championship of the World (or World Blitz Championship) was held in Herceg Novi on 8 April 1970. This was shortly after the first USSR versus the rest of the world match (in Belgrade), in which ten of these players also competed. Eleven Grandmasters and one International Master played a double round-robin tournament. Bobby Fischer won first place, with a score of 19 points out of a possible 22. Fischer scored seventeen wins, four draws, and one loss (to Viktor Korchnoi). Mikhail Tal was a distant second, 4½ points behind. Fischer won both games against each of Tal, Tigran Petrosian, and Vasily Smyslov; all of them were past World Champions.

By 1971, the Russian and Moscow five-minute championships had been going several years, with Tal, Bronstein, and Petrosian all having success. That year, Fischer played in a blitz tournament organised by the Manhattan Chess Club, and scored 21½/22. There were also strong tournaments in Bugojno (in 1978), which was won by Karpov; and Nikšić (in 1983), which was won by Kasparov.

In 1987, the S.W.I.F.T. super-tournament was held in Brussels, Belgium; first prize was shared by Garry Kasparov and Ljubomir Ljubojević. The first FIDE-sponsored World Blitz Championship was won by Mikhail Tal in 1988.

In 1992, FIDE held the Women's World Rapid and Blitz Championship in Budapest, Hungary. Both Rapid and Blitz Championships were won by Susan Polgar.

In 2000, Anand won the Plus GSM World Blitz Chess Cup, which has since been referred to as a world championship, albeit inconsistently.

The second FIDE-recognized World Blitz Championship was won by Alexander Grischuk in 2006 in Rishon Lezion, Israel; the third World Blitz Championship was won by Vassily Ivanchuk in 2007. The 4th World Blitz Championship was held in Almaty in 2008, and it was won by Leinier Dominguez Pérez of Cuba.

In 2009 and 2010, there was an event called the World Blitz Championship, held after the Tal Memorial in Moscow in November. It was won by Magnus Carlsen (in 2009) and Levon Aronian (in 2010), with the Women's Championship being won by Kateryna Lagno (in 2010). There is no record of a 2009 blitz event in the FIDE Calendar for that year; however, the October 2009 FIDE Congress discussed whether it should be a "proper" Championship (given the qualification scheme), and it left the decision to the corresponding internal Commission. For 2010, it was organized in conjunction with FIDE from the beginning. However, in neither case was an arbiter's report presented to the next FIDE Congress or General Assembly, as would be expected for a World Championship, and indeed occurred previously with the 2008 Blitz Championship. The 2012 Arbiter's report refers to 7th World Blitz Championship thus seeming to imply that 2009 and 2010 events were indeed Championships; although this report can be faulted for referring to the rapid championship of 2012 as being the 1st World Rapid Championship, which at the very least forgets Anand's official Rapid Championship in 2003. The balance of the evidence favors these Blitz Championships as being counted as official.

In 2011, there was no official blitz championship held, but FIDE was involved with the Sport Accord Mind Games blitz won by Maxime Vachier-Lagrave, with Hou Yifan winning the women's division.

World Championships since 2012 

Since 2012, FIDE have held joint World Rapid and Blitz Championships most years, with some years Women's World Rapid and Blitz Championships also being held.

In 2012, the World Rapid and Blitz Championships were held at Batumi, Georgia and Astana, Kazakhstan (Women's Championships) Sergey Karjakin won the Rapid Championship. Alexander Grischuk won the Blitz Championship. Antoaneta Stefanova won the Women's Rapid Championship. Valentina Gunina won the Women's Blitz Championship.

In 2013, the World Rapid and Blitz Championships were held at Khanty-Mansiysk, Russia. Shakhriyar Mamedyarov won the Rapid Championship. Lê Quang Liêm won the Blitz Championship.

In 2014, the World Rapid and Blitz Championships were held at Dubai, UAE and Khanty-Mansiysk, Russia (Women's Championships). Magnus Carlsen won both Rapid and Blitz Championships. Kateryna Lagno won the Women's Rapid Championship. Anna Muzychuk won the Women's Blitz Championship.

In 2015, the World Rapid and Blitz Championships were held in Berlin, Germany. Magnus Carlsen won the Rapid Championship. He also received the privilege of playing at a dedicated Board 1 the whole time, not having to move while others did. The given reason was that Norwegian television was sponsoring the event, and moving the heavy cameras around would be too much hassle. After his first-round draw, he should not have been on Board 1 until Round 8 when he caught the leaders. Carlsen himself later called this "weird" that Board 1 would be reserved for him. Alexander Grischuk won the Blitz Championship.

In 2015, FIDE did not receive the expected 80,000 euros from Agon's organization of the event, causing a budget shortfall of 55,000 euros. It was later announced that approximately 200,000 euros were lost on the event.

In 2016, the World Rapid Championships were held at the Ali Bin Hamad Al Attiya Arena in Doha, Qatar. Vassily Ivanchuk of Ukraine won the 2016 World Rapid Championship, while Carlsen, after defending his title with difficulty in 2015, came in third place. In the Blitz Championship, Sergey Karjakin of Russia and contender in the recently held World Chess Championship 2016 won the championship title albeit due to a better tiebreak over the second place Carlsen. Karjakin defeated Carlsen in their individual encounter. Carlsen was once again reserved board 1 for both championships. Anna Muzychuk also from Ukraine, won both the 2016 Women World Rapid and Blitz Championshipship.

At the FIDE Presidential Board meeting at the end of March 2016, they gave Agon six months to find an organizer for the 2017 event. At the Baku General Assembly in September, it was announced they had extended this deadline until the end of 2016. The issue of the non-payment of the players for the IMSA Mind Games was also brought up.

Champions tables for official events

Views on fast chess 

Many top chess players do not take rapid, blitz, and bullet chess as seriously as chess with standard time controls. Some quotes from top chess players may serve to illustrate this:
 "Rapid and blitz chess is first of all for enjoyment." — Magnus Carlsen, although it was noted that Carlsen was "seriously preparing" for the event.
 "Playing rapid chess, one can lose the habit of concentrating for several hours in serious chess. That is why, if a player has big aims, he should limit his rapid play in favour of serious chess." — Vladimir Kramnik
 "Yes, I have played a blitz game once. It was on a train, in 1929." — Mikhail Botvinnik
 "He who analyses blitz is stupid." — Rashid Nezhmetdinov
 "Blitz chess kills your ideas." — Bobby Fischer
 "To be honest, I consider [bullet chess] a bit moronic, and therefore I never play it." — Vladimir Kramnik
 "Blitz – it's just a pleasure." — Vladimir Kramnik
 "I play way too much blitz chess. It rots the brain just as surely as alcohol." — Nigel Short
 "Blitz is simply a waste of time." — Vladimir Malakhov
 "[Blitz] is just getting positions where you can move fast. I mean, it's not chess." — Hikaru Nakamura
 "Blitz is the opposite [of classical chess], you don't care at all. You can be drunk, you can dance all night, whatever happens you just need to be lucky and it will work." - Daniil Dubov

See also
 World Rapid Chess Championship
 World Blitz Chess Championship

Notes

References

Further reading

External links 
 USCF rules
 “Fast Chess” by Edward Winter
 FIDE rapid play and blitz rules
 Speed Chess Online Example
 Online Chess Clock / Chess Timer Example, used for Fast Chess
 Videostream: World Blitz and Rapid Chess Championship 2015 in Berlin, Germany

Chess terminology
Chess variants
History of chess